Carl Gustav Alexander Brischke (December 17, 1814 – 1897) was a German entomologist who worked on Diptera and Hymenoptera, mainly the Ichneumonidae and Braconidae.

Briscke was from Danzig, West Prussia.

He was the author of Die Hymenopteren des Bernsteins; Schriften der Naturforschenden Geselschaft in Danzig, (N.F.), 6(3), 278-279 (1886), and of the four part Die Ichneumoniden der Provinzen West- und Ost-Preussen (Band 1, 1878; Band 2, 1879; Band 3, 1880; Band 4, 1881).

His collections are located in the Staatliches Museum für Naturkunde, Gdańsk, Poland;  Zoologisches Museum Königsberg, Russia and in the Zoological museum in the State University of Kharkiv, Ukraine.

References 

1814 births
1897 deaths
German entomologists
Hymenopterists
Dipterists
Scientists from Gdańsk
People from West Prussia